Mario Alberto Quezada Gutiérrez (born 2 May 1992) is a Mexican footballer who plays as a left-back for Liga Premier de México team CAFESSA Jalisco.

Club career

Early career 
On 2010 Quezada started his career with C.D. Guadalajara where he played for the reserves and Chivas Rayadas in the second and third divisions.

Puebla 
He was transferred to Puebla for the 2013–14 season where he played a couple of games in the Liga MX.
On 23 July 2013, Quezada made his first appearance in a Copa MX match against Estudiantes de Altamira.

Toluca 
On 2015, Quezada was transferred to the Toluca Red Devils and was registered with the first-team squad.

References

External links

1992 births
Living people
Mexican footballers
Association football defenders
Club Puebla players
Deportivo Toluca F.C. players
Lobos BUAP footballers
Murciélagos FC footballers
Club Atlético Zacatepec players
Cimarrones de Sonora players
Deportivo CAFESSA Jalisco footballers
Liga MX players
Ascenso MX players
Liga Premier de México players
Tercera División de México players
Footballers from Durango
People from Gómez Palacio, Durango